Praga is a district of Warsaw, Poland.

Praga may also refer to:

Prague, Czech Republic, in some languages, including Galician, Italian, Latin, Portuguese, Polish, Romanian, Russian, and Spanish
Praga (company), a Prague-based engine, car and aircraft manufacturing company
Praga, Łódź Voivodeship, a village in central Poland
A Praga, a 1980 Brazilian horror film
Praga Tools, manufacturer of machine tools in Telangana, India 
Emilio Praga (1839–1875), Italian poet
Marco Praga (1862–1929), Italian playwright